Uenotrechus is a genus of beetles in the family Carabidae, containing the following species:

 Uenotrechus hybridiformis Ueno, 2002
 Uenotrechus liboensis Deuve & Tian, 1999

References

Trechinae